Journey to the Center of the Earth is a 1993 TV film first aired on NBC. It stars Carel Struycken, Tim Russ, and Jeffrey Nordling, John Neville, F. Murray Abraham, Fabiana Udenio, and Kim Miyori. A TV series was originally planned after its release but it was cancelled.

The film is based on the 1864 novel of the same name by Jules Verne. The film premiered on NBC in United States, while the film was released theatrically in other territories by Columbia Pictures.

Plot 
A team of explorers sets on a voyage to the Earth's core, following an earlier attempt years before. Their ship, Avenger, enters the lava chamber of an active volcano and uses an energy ray called a "sonic blaster" to blast through the flow. They enter in a subterranean world over 100 kilometers below the Earth's surface. The place is filled with many strange creatures. As they explore deeper into the caverns they encounter a yeti which the crew named Dallas that serves as their guide. Meanwhile, an unknown malevolent entity is attempting to recover the missing pieces of an Atlantean artifact known as the "book of knowledge" one of which a crew member of the Avenger brought with him, that will supposedly give massive powers to whoever possesses it.

Cast
 David Dundara as Anthony LaStrella
 Farrah Forke as Dr. Margo Peterson
 Kim Miyori as Dr. Tesue Ishikawa
 John Neville as Dr. Cecil Chalmers
 Jeffrey Nordling as Chris Turner
 Tim Russ as Joe Briggs
 Carel Struycken as Dallas
 Fabiana Udenio as Sandra Miller
 Justina Vail as Devin
 F. Murray Abraham as Professor Harlech
 Francis Guinan as Mr. Wentworth
 Cassie Byram as Secretary
 Connie Craig as Student #1
 Doug Freimuth as Student #2
 Ben Cleaveland as Student #3

References

External links 
 
 
 
 Journey to the Center of the Earth at Rotten Tomatoes

1990s American films
1993 films
1993 science fiction films
1993 television films
American science fiction television films
Columbia Pictures films
Films based on Journey to the Center of the Earth
Films scored by Christopher Franke
Films directed by William Dear
NBC network original films
Television shows based on works by Jules Verne
Travel to the Earth's center